Herbert Millendorfer is an Austrian para-alpine skier. He represented Austria at the 1976 Winter Paralympics and he won one gold medal, one silver medal and one bronze medal.

Achievements

See also 

 List of Paralympic medalists in alpine skiing

References 

Living people
Year of birth missing (living people)
Paralympic alpine skiers of Austria
Alpine skiers at the 1976 Winter Paralympics
Medalists at the 1976 Winter Paralympics
Paralympic bronze medalists for Austria
Paralympic silver medalists for Austria
Paralympic gold medalists for Austria
Place of birth missing (living people)
Paralympic medalists in alpine skiing
20th-century Austrian people